The Lawgiver is a 2012 novel by Herman Wouk depicting a fictional attempt to make a film about the biblical Moses.  It is an epistolary novel, composed of traditional communications such as letters, memos, and articles, as well as utilizing more contemporary means like  e-mails, text messages, and Skype transcripts.

References

2012 American novels
Novels by Herman Wouk
Cultural depictions of Moses
Epistolary novels
Simon & Schuster books